Torjanci is a settlement in the region of Baranja, Croatia. Administratively, it is located in the Petlovac municipality within the Osijek-Baranja County. Population is 267 people.

Parts of settlement

Former parts of settlement are: Greda, Medrović-Lugarna, Pik and Verbak.

Population

Ethnic composition, 1991. census

Austria-Hungary 1910. census

See also
Osijek-Baranja county
Baranja

References

Literature
 Book: "Narodnosni i vjerski sastav stanovništva Hrvatske, 1880–1991: po naseljima, autor: Jakov Gelo, izdavač: Državni zavod za statistiku Republike Hrvatske, 1998., ;

Populated places in Osijek-Baranja County
Baranya (region)